The following highways are numbered 14A:

United States
 Connecticut Route 14A
 Delaware Route 14A (former)
Florida State Road 14A (former)
 Nebraska Spur 14A
 New York State Route 14A
 County Route 14A (Cattaraugus County, New York)
 Ohio State Route 14A
 Secondary State Highway 14A (Washington) (former)

Territories
 Guam Highway 14A